The Kulinic languages form a branch of the Pama–Nyungan family in Victoria (Australia). They are:

Kulin (3+, e.g. Woiwurrung)
Kolakngat
Drual (2)

Warrnambool is Kulinic and may be Drual, but is too poorly attested to be certain.  Gadubanud was a dialect of either Warrnambool or Kolakngat. Several poorly attested interior Kulinic languages, such as Wemba-Wemba, are listed in the Kulin article.

The three branches of Kulinic are not close; Dixon treats them as three separate families.

Bibliography
Dixon, R. M. W. 2002. Australian Languages: Their Nature and Development. Cambridge University Press

References

 
Indigenous Australian languages in Victoria (Australia)